Parapuzosia bradyi is a gigantic species of ammonite, reaching diameters of more than  by . It is the largest species of ammonite in North America. It had a moderately involute shell with flat sides. The inner whorls are slightly oval-shaped with prominent ribbing. They are only known from the upper layers of the Eagle Sandstone and Cody Shale formations (both Late Cretaceous).

References

Cretaceous ammonites
Desmoceratidae